John Henry Ruddell (1859 – April 17, 1906) was a harness maker, realtor and political figure in Manitoba. He represented Morden from 1900 to 1906 in the Legislative Assembly of Manitoba as a Conservative.

He was born in Halton County, Canada West, the son of George Ruddell and Christina Stewart, and came to Manitoba in the early 1880s to establish a harness-making business in Nelson. Ruddell later moved to Morden, where he established a real estate firm. He also served as mayor of Morden.

The town of Ruddell, Saskatchewan may have been named after him.

References 

1859 births
1906 deaths
Progressive Conservative Party of Manitoba MLAs
Mayors of places in Manitoba
People from Morden, Manitoba